Lalita Yauhleuskaya (born 31 December 1963 in Sokol, Russia) is a professional sporting shooter who won a bronze medal at the 2000 Summer Olympics in Sydney representing Belarus and currently represents Australia in international competition.

Yauhleuskaya began competitive shooting at age 13. In 1986, representing the Soviet Union, she finished 5th in the women's 10 metre air pistol at the ISSF World Shooting Championships in Suhl, Germany. Ten years later she was selected in the Belarusian team for the Atlanta Olympics where she placed 8th in the 10m air pistol. Four years later she picked up her bronze medal in the women's 25 metre pistol at the Sydney Olympics. She became an Australian citizen after the Sydney Olympics and represented her new country in Athens and Beijing. She was also selected for the Australian team for the 2012 Summer Olympics in London, finishing in 40th in the women's 10 m air pistol and 17th in the women's 25 m pistol. In 2014 Commonwealth Games, she clinched Bronze Medal in women’s 25-metre pistol event.

Shooting success runs in the family. Lalita’s son; Sergei Evglevski represents Australia and is very successful in his own right. He is currently competing at the Tokyo 2020 Olympics.

References

1963 births
Australian female sport shooters
Belarusian female sport shooters
Commonwealth Games bronze medallists for Australia
Commonwealth Games gold medallists for Australia
Commonwealth Games silver medallists for Australia
Living people
Shooters at the 1996 Summer Olympics
Shooters at the 2000 Summer Olympics
Shooters at the 2002 Commonwealth Games
Shooters at the 2004 Summer Olympics
Shooters at the 2006 Commonwealth Games
Shooters at the 2008 Summer Olympics
Shooters at the 2010 Commonwealth Games
Shooters at the 2012 Summer Olympics
Shooters at the 2014 Commonwealth Games
Shooters at the 2016 Summer Olympics
Olympic bronze medalists for Belarus
Olympic medalists in shooting
Olympic shooters of Australia
Olympic shooters of Belarus
Commonwealth Games medallists in shooting
Medalists at the 2000 Summer Olympics
Belarusian emigrants to Australia
People from Sokol, Vologda Oblast
Sportspeople from Vologda Oblast
Medallists at the 2002 Commonwealth Games
Medallists at the 2006 Commonwealth Games
Medallists at the 2010 Commonwealth Games
Medallists at the 2014 Commonwealth Games